Bilaspur is one of the 68 assembly constituencies of Himachal Pradesh a northern state of India. It is a segment of Hamirpur, Himachal Pradesh Lok Sabha constituency.

Members of Legislative Assembly

Election candidate

2022

Election results

2017

See also
 Bilaspur district
 List of constituencies of Himachal Pradesh Legislative Assembly

References

External links
HP official website of the Chief Electoral Officer

External links
 

Assembly constituencies of Himachal Pradesh
Bilaspur, Himachal Pradesh
Bilaspur district, Himachal Pradesh